Shin Ho-jun (born 14 April 1989) is a retired South Korean professional footballer, who last played for Rangdajied United FC in the I-League. He began his career as a striker for Gwangju University and played there until 2009.

Career statistics

Club

Notes

References

1989 births
Living people
South Korean footballers
South Korean expatriate footballers
Association football forwards
Gwangju University alumni
K3 League (2007–2019) players
I-League players
Cheonan City FC players
Rangdajied United F.C. players
South Korean expatriate sportspeople in India
Expatriate footballers in India